Mason Leeth (born June 1, 2001) is an American college soccer player who plays for Saint Louis University

Leeth formerly played for Sporting Kansas City II in the USL Championship via the Sporting Kansas City Academy. Leeth is also a 2020 graduate of Liberty North High School.

Leeth joined the Sporting Kansas City Academy in 2017, coming from Sporting Blue Valley. With the Academy, he scored 11 goals in 44 appearances with the U-17's and U-19's. On July 2, 2020, Leeth again signed an academy contract to play with Sporting Kansas City II without forfeiting his NCAA eligibility. He made his debut on July 18, 2020, appearing as an 85th-minute substitute during a 2–1 loss to Indy Eleven.

Career

Collegiate 
Ahead of the 2020 NCAA Division I men's soccer season, Leeth signed a National Letter of Intent to play college soccer for Saint Louis University. During the season he made 14 appearances, scoring three goals. Following the 2020 Atlantic 10 Conference men's soccer season, Leeth was named to the All-A10 second team, and the All-A10 rookie team. Leeth was also named a third-team freshman All-American by TopDrawer Soccer.

References

External links 
 Mason Leeth at Saint Louis University Athletics
 Sporting KC profile

2001 births
Living people
American soccer players
Association football defenders
People from Kansas City, Missouri
Saint Louis Billikens men's soccer players
Soccer players from Missouri
Sporting Kansas City II players
USL Championship players